Thomas Stephen Mullen (25 December 1868 – 11 April 1942) was an Australian rules footballer who played with Geelong in the Victorian Football League (VFL).

Notes

External links 

1868 births
1942 deaths
Australian rules footballers from Victoria (Australia)
Geelong Football Club (VFA) players
Geelong Football Club players